Terrace End is a suburb of Palmerston North, New Zealand.

Terrace End is located in the south east part of the city on a bend in the Manawatu River. It is bounded to the north by Main Street East, Roslyn and Kelvin Grove. On the east by Whakarongo, the south by the Manawatu River and Hokowhitu and the west by Ruahine Street, Papaioea and Hokowhitu. 
The suburb is predominantly residential. In 2018, Terrace End had a resident population of 6,177.

The area includes Palmerston North Golf Club, Brightwater Centre, Memorial Park, Balmoral Park and Ruamahanga Wilderness Reserve.

Demographics

It had a population of 6,177 at the 2018 New Zealand census, an increase of 279 people (4.7%) since the 2013 census, and an increase of 399 people (6.9%) since the 2006 census. There were 2,280 households. There were 2,994 males and 3,186 females, giving a sex ratio of 0.94 males per female, with 1,350 people (21.9%) aged under 15 years, 1,452 (23.5%) aged 15 to 29, 2,568 (41.6%) aged 30 to 64, and 816 (13.2%) aged 65 or older.

Ethnicities were 74.6% European/Pākehā, 21.5% Māori, 5.9% Pacific peoples, 12.0% Asian, and 3.4% other ethnicities (totals add to more than 100% since people could identify with multiple ethnicities).

The proportion of people born overseas was 19.3%, compared with 27.1% nationally.

Although some people objected to giving their religion, 47.8% had no religion, 35.7% were Christian, 2.6% were Hindu, 2.4% were Muslim, 0.7% were Buddhist and 3.7% had other religions.

Of those at least 15 years old, 984 (20.4%) people had a bachelor or higher degree, and 960 (19.9%) people had no formal qualifications. The employment status of those at least 15 was that 2,190 (45.4%) people were employed full-time, 681 (14.1%) were part-time, and 276 (5.7%) were unemployed.

Education

References

Suburbs of Palmerston North
Populated places in Manawatū-Whanganui
Populated places on the Manawatū River